Abhishek Pratap Shah (born 1 October 1982) is a Nepalese politician belonging to Nepali Congress. He serves as the member of parliament for Kapilvastu 3. He was previously a member of the first and second Constituent Assembly of Nepal representing Kapilvastu 5.

Personal life 
Shah has a Bachelor of Business Administration (BBA) degree from Babu Banarasi Das National Institute of Technology and Management in Lucknow.

Political career 
In January 2008, Shah was nominated to the interim parliament, taking the seat of his deceased father Ajay Pratap Shah who was an MP for the Rastriya Prajatantra Party. In March 2008 he resigned from the interim legislature, and joined the Madheshi Janaadhikar Forum, Nepal. In the April 2008 Constituent Assembly election he was elected from the Kapilvastu 5 constituency, winning 15,694 votes. Shah was the youngest member elected to the 1st Constituent Assembly of Nepal. He was re-elected from the same constituency in the 2013 Constituent Assembly elections.

In 2017 he left the Federal Socialist Forum, Nepal and joined Nepali Congress ahead of the 2017 general election. He was elected from Kapilvastu 3 securing 20,001 votes. He was a member in the Industry, Commerce, Labour and Consumer Welfare Committee of the House of Representatives.

References

1982 births
Living people
Madhesi Jana Adhikar Forum, Nepal politicians
Rastriya Prajatantra Party politicians

Nepal MPs 2017–2022
Nepali Congress politicians from Lumbini Province

Members of the 1st Nepalese Constituent Assembly
Members of the 2nd Nepalese Constituent Assembly